Sahib Muhammad Ja'faar ud-Din Mirza Mridha (born 1876 in Bengal, died 1921 in Natore) was a feudal lord in Bengal, British Empire who served as the second Zamindar of Natore from the House of Singra and Natore and the "Mridha" (Defense Minister) under the Maharajas of Rajshahi.

Family
He was born in 1876 as the oldest child and first son of Muhammad Zaheer Shah Mirza Sahib, the patriarch of the aristocratic Singranatore family in Mirza Mahal palace in Natore and educated privately in Persian, Arabic, Hindi, Urdu, and Bengali before attending the Rajshahi Collegiate School. He married twice, firstly Humaira Begum and the Abeeda Sultana and had three sons and a daughter.

Biography and military affairs (1870-1921)
His father crushed the Pabna Peasant Uprisings in 1871 for which he was given tracts of land with the ownership made hereditary as a Madhyasvatva. After the death of his father, he ascended to his position and rights as a zamindar. His father had served under Maharaja Chondronath Roy of Natore and maintained 25 horses for 30 lathial (foot soldiers) and three elephants.

Death
He died in 1921 of Cholera in Natore Sadar, British Raj.

Later successors and legacy
The estate which he inherited was extended outwards and was made up of fragmented lands belonging to the declining Ruling family of Natore, which was at one point the second largest estate in all of Bengal after the Maharajas of Burdwan. His son, Jalaluddin Mirza inherited the position after his death in Bengal.

See also
Zamindar of Natore

Bibliography

External links
The Singranatore family listed among the Zamindars of Bengal at Genealogical Gleanings of the Indian Princely States

1876 births
1921 deaths
19th-century Bengalis
20th-century Bengalis
People from British India

fr:Muhammad Akbar Shâh
ja:アクバル・シャー2世